Kottackkal Kanaran Gurukkal (1850–1941) founder of Kalarippayattu, who reclaimed Kalarippayattu from Anyam after British rule. The Kanaran Gurukkal were born in Chekavar Tharavad, a large Landlord near Vadakara, Kozhikode. He belongs to a Thiyya caste.

Kalaripayat, a martial art in Malabar, was banned after the British rule in Malabar, and as a result, the Kalaris and institutions that existed far and wide in Kerala declined.  That is why he is known as Dronacharya of Kalaripayat.  Kanaran Gurukal was an important person among the Kalaripayat gurus who played an early role in the revival of the martial art of Kalaripayat which was destroyed by the British rule. Despite being a big land owner, at the age of forty he sold 160 acres of land to pay for the Kalari institution and so on.  He learned Sambrathayams, Mantra Tantravidya and Dhyana Seva from the Gurus of yesteryear, Arapillakai, Otimurassery, Vattayanthiruppan, Pillatangi.

Later, after studying the gurus' training, he came to Thiruvangat in Thalassery at the age of 65 and established his own Kalari for the first time. It can be said that this bravery of the Kanaran gurus was at a time when people did not come forward for this, even though it was very difficult.  Then CVN  Kalari's founder C.  V. Narayanan was a disciple of Nair Kanaran Gurus

CVN  Relationship with Kalari
In Malabar, CVN later took the lead in bringing Kalaripayat to the people from inside Kalari.  It was through Kalari. [1] C.V.N.  CV Narayanan Nair, the founder of CVN Kalaris, was an important disciple of the Kanaran Gurus at Kottayam, as if we trace the roots of the Kalari Gurus in the medieval period to the Kanaran Gurus.  Kanaran Gurus who started learning only at the age of 40 were the numbered Kalari practitioners after the time of Thacholi Othenan, Narayanan Gurus who were the main disciples of the Gurus and Chirakkal T. Sreedharan Nair who was a contemporary.  CVN  Narayanan Nair studied Abhyasamurahs from Kanaran Gurus and later it can be pointed out the main role of Kanaran Gurus in the establishment and development of Kalari.  Kanaran Gurus disclosed their entire knowledge to C.V.

References

ml:കോട്ടക്കൽ കണാരൻ ഗുരുക്കൾ
1850 births
1941 deaths